Lobesia aeolopa is a moth of the family Tortricidae first described by Edward Meyrick in 1907. It is found in Vietnam, Thailand, India, Sri Lanka, Myanmar, Java, the Solomon Islands, Korea, Japan, Taiwan, São Tomé and Príncipe, Tanzania, South Africa, Réunion and Madagascar.

Biology
The wingspan is 10–12 mm.

Larvae have been found on Ricinus communis, Melochia umbellata, Pluchea indica, Lantana camara, Cajanus indicus, Gleditsia triacanthos and Flacourtia indica, but are possibly predatory on aphids, rather than feeding on plant tissue.

References

External links
Semiochemicals of Lobesia aeolopa

Moths described in 1907
Olethreutini
Moths of Japan
Moths of Madagascar
Moths of Réunion
Moths of São Tomé and Príncipe